The 1982 Caesars Palace Grand Prix was a Formula One motor race held on September 25, 1982 in Las Vegas, Nevada. It was the sixteenth and final race of the 1982 FIA Formula One World Championship, and the second and last F1 race to be held in Caesars Palace.

The 75-lap race was won by Michele Alboreto, driving a Tyrrell-Ford. Alboreto scored Tyrrell's first victory since the 1978 Monaco Grand Prix, becoming the eleventh different winning driver of 1982 while Tyrrell became the seventh different winning constructor. John Watson finished second in a McLaren-Ford, with Eddie Cheever third in a Ligier-Matra. Keke Rosberg finished fifth in his Williams-Ford to secure the Drivers' Championship, with Ferrari taking the Constructors' Championship despite neither car finishing in the top six.

This was the last F1 race for 1978 World Champion Mario Andretti. It was also the last race for the Ensign and Fittipaldi teams, the last for March until , and the last for Matra as an engine supplier.

Qualifying report
For the first time since the World Championship began in 1950, a country hosted three rounds in the same season in 1982. The final race of the year, and the third in the US, would once again decide the Championship. Keke Rosberg of Williams had 42 points, to 33 for McLaren's John Watson, and needed to finish sixth or better to secure the title. Meanwhile, the race was former world champion Mario Andretti's final grand prix.

The course's tight turns and short straights allowed the non-turbo cars to be more competitive than usual, with Michele Alboreto's Tyrrell and Eddie Cheever's Talbot Ligier fastest among them. The turbocharged Renaults of Alain Prost and René Arnoux took first and second positions in qualifying, more than eight-tenths clear of Alboreto. The two Championship contenders, Rosberg and Watson, meanwhile, were in sixth and ninth places respectively, separated by the Ferraris of Mario Andretti and Patrick Tambay.

Championship permutations
Rosberg and Watson both entered this race with a chance of winning the Drivers' Championship.
 Rosberg (42 points) needed either
 6th or higher
 Watson 2nd or lower
 Watson (33 points) needed to win the race, with Rosberg 7th or lower. Had this happened, both drivers would have finished with 42 points, and Watson would have been champion by virtue of having three wins to Rosberg's one.
 The injured Didier Pironi exited championship contention before the race on the grounds of being absent from the event.
For the first time since , three teams entered the final race with a chance of winning the Constructors' Championship.
 Ferrari (74 points) needed either
 2nd (or 4th and 5th) or better
 4th (or 5th and 6th) or better, with the McLarens 1st and 3rd or lower
 5th or better, with the McLarens 1st and 4th or lower
 6th or better, with the McLarens 1st and 5th or lower
 the McLarens scoring fewer than 11 points, with the Renaults 1st and 3rd or lower
 McLaren-Ford (63 points) needed 1st and either
 2nd with the Ferraris scoring fewer than 5 points
 3rd with the Ferraris scoring fewer than 3 points
 4th with the Ferraris 6th or lower
 5th with the Ferraris 7th or lower
 Renault (59 points) needed 1st and 2nd, with the Ferraris 7th or lower. Had this happened, both teams would have finished with 74 points, with Renault then winning by virtue of having five wins to Ferrari's three.

Race report
At the green light for the race on Saturday, Prost led from the pole, followed by teammate Arnoux. Cheever, from the fourth spot on the grid, was determined to get around the outside of Alboreto on the first left-hander. They touched wheels, but both continued with Alboreto still in front, Cheever's Ligier sporting a vibrating front wheel and the Tyrrell of Alboreto bearing a tire mark on the right sidepod.

For the first ten laps, the Renaults steadily pulled away from Alboreto, with Arnoux now leading Prost. The Tyrrell began to match Arnoux's times, however, and then to close on him, as Prost took back the lead on lap 15. Speculation of a problem with Arnoux's car proved true, as the Renault was faltering, and he retired on lap 21.

Watson, meanwhile, had dropped to twelfth in the opening laps, but passed Piquet on lap 12, then Rosberg, Andretti and Cheever on successive laps, eventually reaching third place, with a thirty-second gap to the two leaders. However, when Andretti, hoping to help clinch the Constructors' title for Ferrari, slid off directly in front of Rosberg on lap 27 with a broken rear suspension link, Rosberg took over the fifth place he sought.

Among the leaders, Alboreto began inching closer to Prost again, and Watson continued to close on both of them. Niki Lauda's McLaren retired on lap 54, while Alboreto had eliminated the gap to Prost, and gotten by him to take the lead in a Grand Prix for the first time. Prost's tires were picking up rubber and had developed a vibration. In four more laps, Watson had also caught and passed him, but he was having the same problem as Prost, and so could make no progress on Alboreto.

Alboreto cruised to a comfortable victory, his first ever and the first for Tyrrell in four years. Alboreto was the 11th different victor that year. Cheever was also able to overtake the ailing Prost for third, nine laps from the end. Less than three seconds behind Prost, and the last car on the lead lap, was Rosberg, who therefore won the world title. Ferrari won the Constructors' Championship despite not finishing in the points.

Classification

Qualifying

Race

Final championship standings after the race

Drivers' Championship standings

Constructors' Championship standings

References

Further reading
 Rob Walker (January, 1983). "2nd Las Vegas Grand Prix: King Keke". Road & Track, 96–99.
 Mike S. Lang (1992). Grand Prix!: Race-by-race account of Formula 1 World Championship motor racing. Volume 4: 1981 to 1984. Haynes Publishing Group. 

Caesars Palace Grand Prix
Caesars Palace Grand Prix
Caesars Palace Grand Prix
Caesars Palace Grand Prix